is a Japanese anime television series which aired as half of the Princess Hour with Final Approach as its second feature. It aired between October and December 2004. Like Final Approach, the show was based on a video game by the same name published by Trinet Entertainment.

Summary
Junna Tōno has a twin sister named Senna. He is an ordinary student at Sakurahama Private High School. However, in the past, a traffic accident deprived him of his parents and his memory. Junna survived the accident and since then, he lived only with his sister, though he's been looked after by his relatives.

His present life with Senna at the same high school is so pleasant that he can forget his severe past. However, Junna begins to recall the memories he lost in the accident. He enjoys the happy and pleasant days, but he is tossed by his past, his present, and his future. What is the truth hidden in his memory?

Characters

The male protagonist of the anime. He is a very popular boy with both his female classmates and some of his male peers. However, things were not what they seem to be just because of him and Senna. He was forced to make a difficult decision in the end, to choose to live in a world with Senna, or a world with his parents and Haruhi as his sister.

The twin sister to Junna. Because their parents died in a car crash, Senna and her brother live together alone in a house. Senna and Junna support and rely on each other, and due to this Senna is very fond of her Onii-chan. However, Senna's existence is doubted as she does not exist in the real world, only in a world which she and Junna had created by their wish, they both wished that Senna will exist, thus, creating a world where she existed. Sadly, a compensation is required to make up for the wish, so their parents had ceased to exist in the created world as well as Haruhi, who was her sister, had become Junna's childhood friend instead. She was supposed to be Junna's twin sister in the real world too, but she was not born, which is the reason she did not exist in the original world and make the wish.

First grade of the middle school division. She is in the Help & Literature club. She has a bright attitude and is always trying to help but always ended up making things worse instead.

Class representative of Junna's class. Although she loves supernatural things, she is also very scared of them.

She just transferred to Junna's school (Sakurahama Private School). A childhood friend of Junna, who calls Junna her "Onii-chan". She's quite attached to Junna. She is actually Junna's sister in the original world but became a childhood friend in the created world. She was also not supposed to exist in the created world but came to search for Junna, who had disappeared suddenly in the original world.

Junna's friend, Tomo's twin brother. He looks like he's sexually attracted towards Junna.

Twin sister of Junna's friend Tomokazu-kun. She seems to have a serious personality and stoic expressions. She is also the Keeper of Time.

 
The school's "idol girl"; rich, intelligent, and attractive. She belongs to the Help & Literature club.

Episode list

Music
Opening Theme: "KIZUNA" by Ayane
Ending Theme: "Omoide good night" by tiaraway

Reception

References

External links
Game official site 

2004 anime television series debuts
2004 video games
Bishōjo games
Harem anime and manga
Harem video games
PrincessSoft games